KBED (1510 AM; branded as Sports Radio Beaumont) is a radio station serving the Beaumont-Port Arthur area with a sports format. It is under ownership of Cumulus Media, and is simulcast with sister station KIKR AM 1450 Beaumont, Texas.  Its studios are located on South Eleventh Street in Beaumont and its transmitter is located south of Vidor, Texas.

History
KBED was initially proposed by Felix & James Joynt in 1959. The Joynts requested to obtain a construction permit to build a 1 kilowatt daytime broadcasting radio station at 1510 kHz, under the name KWEN Broadcasting on October 26, 1959, which was filed by the Federal Communications Commission the following day. The proposed facility was constructed 3 miles northwest of 16th Street, on U.S. Highway 69 in Port Arthur, receiving a License to Cover on February 20, 1969.

The facility was issued its first callsign KCAW, standing for Country And Western, on November 7, 1968. The Joynts would file to modify the location of the transmission site to a location on Texas State Highway 347, .7 miles northwest of 39th Street, which is where the facility signed on from in Port Arthur. That tower now is used as a cell site tower.

The transmitter was moved to its current South Vidor location (where its former FM sister KYKR-FM was located) when the FCC approved a power increase from 1,000 watts to the current 5,000 watts on August 1, 1980. Accompanied by the upgrade in ERP, the Community of License was changed to Nederland, as well. The callsign changed to KYKR, along with its FM sister 93.3, in 1974.

Eventually, owner Jimmie Joynt sold both the AM and FM to different owners. 1510 saw a couple of different owners (including Clear Channel at one time) including various religious owners.

On January 4, 1988, the KYKR tower in South Vidor suffered a massive fire believed to be arson. Both 93.3 FM and 1510 AM transmitters were lost. KYKR struggled with borrowed equipment to make it back on the air at low power and eventually recovered.

Because it shares the same frequency as "clear channel" radio station WLAC in Nashville, Tennessee, KBED only broadcasts during the daytime hours.

External links

Sports radio stations in the United States
BED
Cumulus Media radio stations
BED